This is Criss! is an album by saxophonist Sonny Criss recorded in 1966 and released on the Prestige label.

Reception

AllMusic awarded the album 4½ stars with its review by Stephen Cook stating, "Sonny Criss qualifies as one of the most overlooked giants of West Coast jazz. His soundlike most alto players of the bebop and hard bop dayswas heavily influenced by Charlie Parker, but Criss still managed to forge an original style featuring a very original melodic bent with loads of bluesy underpinnings. The goods can be optimally previewed on this great Prestige date from 1966."

Track listing
 "Black Coffee" (Sonny Burke, Paul Francis Webster) – 7:52    
 "Days of Wine and Roses" (Henry Mancini, Johnny Mercer) – 3:20    
 "When Sunny Gets Blue" (Marvin Fisher, Jack Segal) – 5:41    
 "Greasy" (Walter Davis, Jr.) – 2:28    
 "Sunrise, Sunset" (Jerry Bock, Sheldon Harnick) – 2:52    
 "Steve's Blues" (Sonny Criss) – 6:23    
 "Skylark" (Hoagy Carmichael, Mercer) – 5:10    
 "Love for Sale" (Cole Porter) – 6:25 (CD bonus track)

Personnel
Sonny Criss – alto saxophone
Walter Davis Jr. – piano
Paul Chambers – bass
Alan Dawson – drums

References

Sonny Criss albums
Prestige Records albums
1966 albums
Albums produced by Don Schlitten
Albums recorded at Van Gelder Studio